Micropterix aureofasciella is a species of moth belonging to the family Micropterigidae which was described by Heath in 1986. It is only known from Algeria, where it occurs along the coastal belt from Algiers to Skikda (formerly known as Philippeville).

References

Micropterigidae
Endemic fauna of Algeria
Moths described in 1986
Moths of Africa
Taxa named by John Heath